Pseudotomoxia palpalis is a species of beetle in the genus Pseudotomoxia of the family Mordellidae, which is part of the superfamily Tenebrionoidea. It was described in 1965 by Francisco.

References

Beetles described in 1965
Mordellidae